Music Music Music is a 2008 album by John Barrowman preceded by the digital-only single "What About Us?", written by Gary Barlow and Chris Braide. The album consists mostly of cover versions and was produced by Simon Franglen (who has worked with Celine Dion, Whitney Houston, Barbra Streisand, The Ten Tenors) and Graham Stack (who has worked with Kylie Minogue, Tina Turner, Rod Stewart), with the exception of the first single "What About Us?" (UK #122) which was produced by Chris Braide. The album debuted and peaked at #35 in the UK, making it Barrowman's second top forty album, after the #22 peak of Another Side in 2007. The set also produced his first UK Top 75 charting single, "I Made It Through the Rain", which spent one week in the charts at #14 in August 2009.

Track listing
Adapted from Discogs.

Personnel 
 David Keary – guitar
 Martin Elliot – bass guitar
 Matthew Brind – piano
 Mark Pusey – drums

References 

2008 albums
Covers albums